Maximiliano Matías Calzada Fuentes (born 21 April 1990 in Santa Lucía) is a Uruguayan footballer who plays for Uruguayan River Plate as a defensive midfielder.

International career
Calzada was part of Uruguay's under-20 squad at the 2009 South American Youth Championship and at 2009 FIFA U-20 World Cup.

He was called up by Óscar Tabárez for the 2012 Summer Olympics being held in London, Great Britain, and played in two games.

Titles
Nacional
Uruguayan Primera División (3): 2008-09, 2010-11, 2011-12

References

External links
 
 

1990 births
Living people
Uruguayan footballers
Uruguay under-20 international footballers
Uruguayan expatriate footballers
Club Atlético Banfield footballers
Club Nacional de Football players
Defensa y Justicia footballers
Arsenal de Sarandí footballers
Club Atlético River Plate (Montevideo) players
Uruguayan Primera División players
Argentine Primera División players
Expatriate footballers in Argentina
Footballers at the 2012 Summer Olympics
Olympic footballers of Uruguay
Association football midfielders